South Rauceby Hall, South Rauceby, Lincolnshire, England is a country house dating from the mid-19th century. It was designed by William Burn in 1842 for Anthony Peacock Willson. Inherited by the Cracroft-Amcotts family, it remains a private home. It is a Grade II listed building.

History
South Rauceby Hall, often simply Rauceby Hall, is built on the site of an earlier house. The present building was commissioned in 1842 by Anthony Peacock Willson, a local banker, on his acquiring the Rauceby estate in 1842. He engaged William Burn, a Scottish architect with a large country house practice. Burn had already undertaken work in Lincolnshire, at Stoke Rochford Hall, and at Harlaxton Manor, and was to continue his work in the county at Revesby Abbey. Following the death of Willson, and of his four unmarried and childless sons, the house was inherited in 1931 by a distant relative, John Cracroft-Amcotts. In the 1940s, Neville Henderson, a relative of the Cracroft-Amcotts, and British ambassador to Berlin in the years immediately prior to the outbreak of the Second World War, lived at the house, writing his memoir, Failure of a Mission: Berlin 1937–1939, while in residence. South Rauceby Hall remains in the ownership of the Cracroft-Amcotts family and is not open to the public. The park is occasionally accessible.

Architecture
Nicholas Antram, in his 2002 revised volume Lincolnshire, in the Pevsner Buildings of England series, describes the architectural style of South Rauceby as Tudor Gothic, and notes that the hall lacks the Baroque elements of Revesby Abbey and Stoke Rochford Hall. The house is of two main storeys, with basements and attics. The construction material is limestone ashlar. South Rauceby Hall is a Grade II listed building as is the entrance lodge, with its gates and railings. The gardens and park are designated Grade II on the Register of Historic Parks and Gardens of Special Historic Interest in England.

Notes

References

Sources
 

Grade II listed buildings in Lincolnshire
Country houses in Lincolnshire
Gardens in Lincolnshire
Grade II listed houses
Houses completed in 1842
Jacobethan architecture
Tudor Revival architecture
South Kesteven District